The Nurul Islam Mosque is a mosque in the Bo-Kaap area of Cape Town, South Africa. When it was founded in 1844, the structure could hold 150 worshipers. Renovated in 2001, it can now hold 700 worshipers.

See also
 Islam in South Africa

References

Mosques in Cape Town
Religious buildings and structures completed in 1844
1844 establishments in the Cape Colony
19th-century religious buildings and structures in South Africa